Andrea Bernini (born 10 June 1973 in Reggello) is a retired Italian footballer.

Career
Bernini started his career at Serie D clubs. At age of 24 he started his professional career at Montevarchi, a Serie C1 club. In summer 1999 he was spotted by Serie A club Reggina, where he played for 2 seasons. Bernini then played for traditional giant Sampdoria but at Serie B. He was released by the Genoa club after the team won promotion. He signed for another traditional club, Napoli, but again Napoli faced bankrupt at the end of season. In summer 2004, he was signed by newly relegated Serie B team Perugia, where he played for 3 and a half season.

In January 2008, he was signed by Lecco.

In 2009, Bernini was transferred to his original club, Sangiovannese where he began his professional career.

References

External links
Lecco profile
 Football.it Profile 

Italian footballers
Reggina 1914 players
U.C. Sampdoria players
S.S.C. Napoli players
A.C. Perugia Calcio players
Calcio Lecco 1912 players
A.S.D. Sangiovannese 1927 players
Serie A players
Serie B players
Association football midfielders
Sportspeople from the Metropolitan City of Florence
1973 births
Living people
Italian expatriate football managers
Expatriate football managers in Ukraine
Italian football managers
Italian expatriate sportspeople in Ukraine
Footballers from Tuscany